Florian Gärtner (born 23 April 1968 in Korbach) is a German film director and author.

Life and career 
Florian Gärtner grew up in Marburg and London. He studied English literature and media studies at Philipps University, Marburg and the Free University, Berlin. At age 15, Gärtner made his first home movie. He continued making shorts and eventually award-winning feature-length Super-8-films throughout his school and university years.

Gärtner's film Dragonland premiered at the Max Ophüls Film Festival in 1999, where it won the Interfilmpreis. The film also screened at the Berlin Film Festival 1999.

Florian Gärtner lives in Berlin.

Filmography 

 1993: aliens (director, screenplay)
 1996: Niemand außer mir (director, screenplay)
 1999: Dragonland (director, screenplay)
 2003: Sex Up (director, screenplay)
 2003: Mensch Mutter (Director, screenplay)
 2005: Sex Up 2 (director, screenplay)
 2007: Das zweite Leben (director, screenplay)
 2008: The Lightship (director)
 2008: Morgen, Ihr Luschen! Der Ausbilder Schmidt Film (screenplay)
 2012: Manche mögen's glücklich (director)
 2012: The Mongolettes - We want to rock! (director)
 2012: Mann kann, Frau erst recht (director, screenplay)
 2013: Trennung auf Italienisch (director)
 2015: Tatort: Borowski und die Kinder von Gaarden (director)
 2017: Black Bread in Thailand (director, screenplay)
 2018: Lotta & der Ernst des Lebens (director)
 2019: Ein Sommer auf Mallorca (director)
 2019: Real Guys (director)
 2020: Clueless in Ireland (director)

References

External links 

 
 Florian Gärtner at filmportal.de

1968 births
German film directors
Living people